The Constitution of the German Empire was the basic law of the German Empire of 1871-1918, from 16 April 1871, coming into effect on 4 May 1871. German historians often refer to it as Bismarck's imperial constitution, in German the Bismarcksche Reichsverfassung (BRV).

According to the constitution, the empire was a federation (federally organised national state) of 25 German states under the permanent presidency of Prussia, the largest and most powerful state. The presidency of the confederation (Bundespräsidium) was a hereditary office of the King of Prussia, who had the title of German Emperor. The Emperor appointed the Chancellor, the head of government and chairman of the Bundesrat, the council of representatives of the German states. Laws were enacted by the Bundesrat and the Reichstag, the Imperial Diet elected by male Germans above the age of 25 years.

The constitution followed an earlier constitution of 1 January 1871, the Constitution of the German Confederation. That constitution had already incorporated some of the agreements between the North German Confederation and the four German states south of the River Main. It renamed the country to Deutsches Reich (conventionally translated to 'German Empire') and gave the Prussian King the title of German Emperor.

The constitutions of 1 January and 4 May 1871 are both essentially an amended version of the North German Constitution, which had likewise been instigated by Otto von Bismarck. The political system remained the same.

The constitution lost its effect in the November Revolution of 1918: the legislative and executive powers were performed by a new revolutionary organ. A national assembly created in 1919 a new, republican constitution: the Weimar Constitution, which has the same title in German as its predecessor (Verfassung des Deutschen Reiches, or 'Constitution of the German Reich').

Signatories and members
The constitution was signed by William I, the King of Prussia, acting in his capacity as Bundespräsidium of the North German Confederation, the Kings of Bavaria and Württemberg, and the Grand Dukes of Baden and Hesse. Hesse north of the river Main was already a member of the North German Confederation; its territory south of the river was now included as well.

The member states of the North German Confederation that now became members of the Empire were Prussia, Saxony, Mecklenburg-Schwerin, Saxe-Weimar-Eisenach, Mecklenburg-Strelitz, Oldenburg, Brunswick, Saxe-Meiningen, Saxe-Altenburg, Saxe-Coburg-Gotha, Anhalt, Schwarzburg-Rudolstadt, Schwarzburg-Sondershausen, Waldeck, Reuss (older line), Reuss (younger line), Schaumburg-Lippe, Lippe, Lübeck, Bremen, and Hamburg.

The Emperor

The empire was officially defined as a federation of the member states under the permanent presidency of Prussia.  The presidency of the Confederation (Bundespräsidium) was a hereditary office of the King of Prussia. From 1 January 1871 onward, he was granted the additional title of German Emperor (Deutscher Kaiser). Thus, the imperial crown was tied to the office of the King of Prussia. Wilhelm II discovered this at the end of World War I. He believed that he ruled the Empire in personal union with Prussia, and could merely abdicate as German Emperor while keeping the Prussian crown. However, he realized that he could not do so without renouncing the entire constitution, which would have been, in effect, the de jure dissolution of the Empire.

Article 11 stated that the emperor had the power to declare war (and make peace), represent the Empire abroad, conclude treaties and alliances, and accredit and receive ambassadors. In the case of a non-defensive war being declared, consent of the Bundesrat was required. Both the Bundesrat and the Reichstag had to approve a treaty and also had to approve laws for it to be ratified. 

He had other powers:
To convene the Bundesrat and the Reichstag (Article 12); the convocation of the Bundesrat was required to take place as soon as demanded by one-third of its members (Article 14).
To execute and publish Imperial laws (Article 17).
To appoint and dismiss Imperial officials (Article 18).

The Reichskanzler (Imperial Chancellor)

The Emperor exercised his powers with the assistance of the Chancellor of the Empire (Reichskanzler). The Chancellor was appointed by the Emperor, to whom he was solely responsible.  He presided over the Bundesrat and supervised the conduct of its business. The Chancellor had the right to delegate the power to represent him to any member of the Bundesrat. (Article 15)

Decrees and ordinances of the Emperor required the counter-signature of the Chancellor to be valid (Article 17).

On paper, the Chancellor was a one-man cabinet.  In practice, however, the Secretaries of State functioned much like ministers in other monarchies.

Legislation
Imperial laws were enacted, via simple majority, by both the Reichstag (parliament) and the Bundesrat (Article 5). These laws took precedence over the laws of the individual states (Article 2).

Article 13 required the annual convocation of both bodies. The Bundesrat could be called together for the preparation of business without the Reichstag, but not the converse.

The Bundesrat

The Bundesrat (Articles 6 and 7) was made up of representatives of the various states. In German constitutional law, it was not considered a parliament chamber, but foreign commentators tended to reckon it as an upper house. It can be translated into English as Federal Council.

Each state was allocated a specified number of votes; although a state could appoint as many delegates to the Bundesrat as it had votes, the delegates from each state voted as a bloc. Each state had a different number of representatives, with the larger and more powerful states having more. Voting had to be in person, and representatives in some cases had to be bound by the instructions of their state governments.

In the case of legislation affecting only certain states, only those states were allowed to vote.

The Bundesrat's presiding officer could break ties.

A representative could not be a member of both chambers at the same time (Article 9) and was given Imperial protection (Article 10).

The apportionment of the Bundesrat in 1871–1919 was:

Permanent committees of the Bundesrat
The constitution established permanent committees (Article 8):
The army, including fortifications
Naval matters
Duties and taxation
Commerce and trade
The railways, post, and telegraphs
Justice
Finance

At least four states had to be represented on each committee, excluding the chairman. Each state was allowed one vote.

On the committee for the army and fortifications, Bavaria had a permanent seat. All of that committee's members were appointed by the Emperor; members of all the other committees were elected by the Bundesrat.

Additionally, there was created a Committee on Foreign Affairs, chaired by Bavaria, with individual members representing Bavaria, Saxony, and Württemberg, and two other members representing the other states.

The Reichstag

Membership of the parliament, the Reichstag or Imperial Diet, was by universal suffrage (this was interpreted to mean suffrage for all male citizens over 25). A secret ballot was guaranteed (Article 20).

Transitional arrangements set the total number of deputies at 382, with 48 for Bavaria, 17 for Württemberg, 14 for Baden, and 6 for Hesse south of the river Main (Article 20).

Bills would be laid before the Reichstag in the name of the emperor, in accordance with a resolution of the Bundesrat, and would be advocated by members of the Bundesrat (or by special commissioners appointed by it)(Article 16).

Imperial legislative powers
Article 4 detailed the areas for which the Empire was responsible for, or was entitled to legislate on:
Business activity
Matters concerning natives of one state who were resident in another
Citizenship
Surveillance of foreign individuals and businesses
The issuing of passports
Insurance business (with some exceptions for Bavaria)
Colonial activity
Emigration
Administration of imperial revenue
Regulation of weights and measures
Coinage and the issuing of paper money
Banking
Intellectual property
Protection of German trade and shipping outside of the country
Consular representation abroad
Railways (with some exceptions for Bavaria)
Road and canal construction for means of national defence
Management of inter-state shipping
Post and telegraphic services (with some exceptions for Bavaria and Württemberg)
Authentication of public documents
Civil law, including its administration
Criminal law, including its administration
The Imperial Army and Navy
Supervision of the medical and veterinary professions.
Press
Trade unions

Citizenship

A single German citizenship was created, with equal treatment of citizens within each state guaranteed (Article 3). However, until 1913, a person would hold the citizenship of the Empire as a result of holding the citizenship of one of the States. Therefore, initially, the criteria for becoming a citizen (the rules of acquisition of citizenship by descent, birth, marriage, legitimation, for a German through admission, or through naturalization), were laid down by the separate laws of the individual States. Only on 22 July 1913 was a common uniform Nationality Law for the Empire – the Nationality Law of the German Empire and States (Reichs- und Staatsangehörigkeitsgesetz, shorthand: RuStAG) – adopted.

Imperial officials
Formally, imperial officials were appointed and dismissed by the Emperor. They were required to take an oath of allegiance. Imperial officials appointed from one of the states were guaranteed the same rights as given them by their native state. (Article 18)

Amendments
The constitution was amended on 20 December 1873 by the Lex Miquel-Lasker to make the entirety of civil law the responsibility of the Empire.  However, it took some two decades before a national civil code was finally promulgated (as the Bürgerliches Gesetzbuch).

In 1911 the constitution was amended to treat the Imperial Territory of Alsace-Lorraine as a state in some regards, including limited voting power in the Bundesrat.

The constitution was heavily amended in the waning days of World War I.  The amended document, known as the Oktoberverfassung ("October Constitution") was debated and passed by the Reichstag in late October 1918. The most important changes were:
 Declarations of war and peace treaties now required the assent of the Reichstag
 Members of the government could now simultaneously be members of the Reichstag
 The Reichskanzler and the Secretaries of State now required the confidence of the Reichstag. They were accountable for the conduct of their affairs to the Reichstag and the Bundesrat
 The Reichskanzler was now responsible for all political actions of the Emperor
 The Emperor's rights to appoint, promote or reassign military officers were now limited by requiring the co-signature of the Reichskanzler or the Minister of War responsible for the contingent. The Ministers of War were now accountable to the Bundesrat and Reichstag for the management of their contingent
The changes came into force on 28 October, transforming the authoritarian Empire into a parliamentary democratic monarchy on the British model.

However, one month later, with the defeat of Germany in World War I and the November Revolution, the monarchy ceased to exist and the Constitution technically became obsolete.

It formally remained in force, though, and was only changed on 10 February 1919 by the Gesetz über die vorläufige Reichsgewalt passed by the National Assembly. In fact, the Übergangsgesetz of 4 March stipulated explicitly that the 1871 constitution was still valid unless in contradiction to laws passed since November 1918. A new constitution, completely replacing the Imperial one, came into force in the Reich only on 14 August 1919.

See also 
 Basic Law for the Federal Republic of Germany
 Kommandogewalt

References

Bibliography

External links 

  Act concerning the constitution of the German Empire (Constitution of the German Empire of 16 April 1871, in full text)

1871 in Germany
1871 in law
1871 documents
Government of the German Empire
Treaties involving territorial changes
Historical constitutions of Germany
1871 in politics
May 1871 events